"If Ole Hank Could Only See Us Now" is a song co-written and recorded by American country music artist Waylon Jennings. It was released in January 1988 as the second single from the album A Man Called Hoss. The song reached number 16 on the Billboard Hot Country Singles & Tracks chart. The song was written by Jennings and Roger Murrah. Jennings would perform the song live in a cameo appearance during episode 2 of Tanner '88.

Chart performance

References

1988 singles
1987 songs
Waylon Jennings songs
Songs written by Waylon Jennings
Songs written by Roger Murrah
Song recordings produced by Jimmy Bowen
MCA Records singles
Songs about Hank Williams